Queenswood Heights is a neighbourhood located in Orleans, the suburb in the east end of Ottawa, Ontario, Canada. Prior to amalgamation in 2001, the neighbourhood was in the Township of Cumberland. Queenswood Heights is bounded by St. Joseph Boulevard to the north, Tenth Line Road to the east, Innes Road to the south, and the former Cumberland-Gloucester boundary to the west (the Queenswood Heights Community Association considers Duford St. to be the western boundary). According to the Canada 2016 Census, the population of the neighbourhood was 11,031. Queenswood Heights spans .

Schools 
There are four elementary level schools serving the needs of young students in the neighbourhood.

 Our Lady of Wisdom Catholic School - English Catholic elementary School
 École élémentaire catholique Reine-des-Bois - Catholic French language elementary school
 Dunning-Foubert Elementary School - English public elementary school
 École élémentaire catholique La Source - Catholic French language elementary school
 Queenswood Public School - closed in June 2008.

Roads 
The main roads in this neighbourhood are:

 Des Épinettes Avenue
 Prestwick Drive
 St. Georges Street
 Amiens Street
 Duford Drive
 Tompkins Avenue
 Prestone Drive

Transit 
Queenswood Heights is serviced by the following OC Transpo bus routes:

Shopping 
There is a small strip mall at the corner of des Épinettes and Prestwick which includes:
 Quickie Convenience Store (Closed)
 Canada Post counter (located inside the Quickie).
 Mama Rosa's Pizza
 Mobile Plus
 Expressions Hair Design

There is also a small strip mall located at the corner of Tompkins Ave & Tenth Line Rd which includes:
 Circle K
 M&M Meat Shops
 Milano Pizzeria

Nature trails 
Currently there are 5.5 km of trails in Queenswood Heights; these trails include a ravine, foot bridges, benches, etc.

References

External links
 Queenswood Heights Community Association

Populated places established in 1962
1962 establishments in Ontario
Neighbourhoods in Ottawa